Gustaf Edvard Helenelund (6 June 1885, Solf - 13 March 1976) was a Swedish-speaking Finnish farmer and politician. He was a member of the Parliament of Finland from 1919 to 1924, from 1927 to 1929 and from 1930 to 1945, representing the Swedish People's Party of Finland (SFP).

References

1885 births
1976 deaths
People from Korsholm
People from Vaasa Province (Grand Duchy of Finland)
Swedish People's Party of Finland politicians
Members of the Parliament of Finland (1919–22)
Members of the Parliament of Finland (1922–24)
Members of the Parliament of Finland (1927–29)
Members of the Parliament of Finland (1930–33)
Members of the Parliament of Finland (1933–36)
Members of the Parliament of Finland (1936–39)
Members of the Parliament of Finland (1939–45)
Finnish people of World War II